Psydrax odorata, known as alahee in Hawaiian, is a species of flowering shrub or small tree in the coffee family, Rubiaceae. It is native to the Pacific Islands, New Guinea and Australia.

Description
The fruits of the plant are quite round, are black in colour and 3/8 wide.

Ecology
The fruits produce many seeds which are often attacked by the larvae of Alucita objurgatella, a species of the many-plumed moths.

Habitat

Uses
Native Hawaiians used the very hard wood of alahee to make koi alahee (adzes for cutting softer woods such as Erythrina sandwicensis), ōō (digging sticks), and o (short spears). A black dye was made from the leaves.

References

External links

odorata
Flora of the Pacific
Flora of New Guinea
Flora of Australia
Plants described in 1786